Kim Hee-chul (born July 10, 1983), better known by the mononym Heechul, is a South Korean singer, songwriter, presenter, and actor. He is a member of South Korean boy band Super Junior and has further participated in its subgroup, Super Junior-T as well as project group Universe Cowards with Min Kyung-hoon. He is also a former member of Kim Heechul & Kim Jungmo.

Songwriting credits

See also
 Super Junior discography
 Super Junior-T#Discography
 Kim Heechul & Kim Jungmo#Discography

References

Songs written
Kim Hee-chul